The Boston Associates were a loosely linked group of investors in 19th-century New England. They included Nathan Appleton, Patrick Tracy Jackson, Abbott Lawrence, and Amos Lawrence. Often related directly or through marriage, they were based in Boston, Massachusetts. The term "Boston Associates" was coined by historian Vera Shlakmen in 1935.

Investments 
By 1845, 31 textile companies—located in Massachusetts, New Hampshire, and southern Maine—produced one-fifth of all cotton and wool textiles in the United States.  With the capital earned through these mills, they invested in railroads, especially the Boston and Lowell. These railroads helped transport the cotton from warehouses to factories. These Boston-based investors established banks—such as the Suffolk Bank—and invested in others. In time, they controlled 40% of banking capital in Boston, 40% of all insurance capital in Massachusetts, and 30% of Massachusetts' railroads. Tens of thousands of New Englanders received employment from these investors, working in any one of the hundreds of their mills.

Mill locations established or improved by the Boston Associates:
Waltham, Massachusetts (1813)
Lowell, Massachusetts (1822)
Manchester, New Hampshire (1825)
Saco, Maine (1831)
Nashua, New Hampshire (1836)
Dover, New Hampshire (1836)
Chicopee, Massachusetts (1838)
Lawrence, Massachusetts (1845)
Holyoke, Massachusetts (1847)

Philosophy

Despite being "shrewd, far-sighted entrepreneurs who were quick to embrace...new investment opportunities", the Boston Associates were also "committed to the ideals of the original Protestant ethic and Republican simplicity". Indeed, the members established more than 30 "benevolent societies and institutions" between 1810 and 1840. Their investment in the Boston Manufacturing Company's Lowell Mills project, which Henry Clay called a test for "whether the manufacturing system is compatible with social virtues", epitomized their worldview.

See also
Boston Brahmin
Boston Manufacturing Company
Francis Cabot Lowell (businessman)
Israel Thorndike
Paul Moody (inventor)

Further reading
 Dalzell, Robert F. Enterprising elite: The Boston Associates and the world they made (Harvard University Press, 1987)
 Dalzell, Robert. "The Boston Associates and the Rise of the Waltham-Lowell System: A Study In Entrepreneurial Motivation." in Robert Weible, ed.  The Continuing Revolution: A History of Lowell, Massachusetts (1991) pp: 39-75.
 Hartford, William F. Money, morals, and politics: Massachusetts in the age of the Boston Associates (Northeastern University Press, 2001)
 Malone, Patrick M. Waterpower in Lowell: Engineering and Industry in Nineteenth-Century America (2009)
Sobel, Robert The Entrepreneurs: Explorations Within the American Business Tradition (Weybright & Talley 1974), chapter 1, Francis Cabot Lowell: The Patrician as Factory Master. 
 Prince, Carl E., Seth Taylor. "Daniel Webster, the Boston Associates, and the U.S. Government's Role in the Industrializing Process, 1815-1830" Journal of the Early Republic (Autumn, 1982) 2#3, pp. 283–299
Weil, Francois. "Capitalism and Industrialization in New England, 1815-1845." Journal of American History Vol. 84, No. 4 (Mar., 1998), pp. 1334–1354.
Farrow; Anne, John Lang; Jennifer Frank; "Complicity: How the North Promoted, Prolonged, and Profited from Slavery." Chapter 1. Ballantine Books, The Hartford Courant Company: Hartford, Connecticut. 2005.

References

Investment management companies of the United States
Economic history of Boston
19th century in Boston
American city founders